Rona Miriel Stevenson  (13 February 1911 – 4 September 1988) was a New Zealand politician of the National Party.

Born in Wellington in 1911, she served on the executives of the Women's Division of Federated Farmers, the YWCA and the Presbyterian Church.

She represented the Taupo electorate from 1963 to 1972, when she retired. The Taupo seat was a marginal one and the women's section of the National Party raised a large sum of money to ensure her re-election. Also in 1966 she also called for the names of women in 'so-called rape cases' to have their names published on the grounds that they may have been provocative, a move that may not have gained her support from women voters.

Stevenson was appointed a Member of the Order of the British Empire, for services to the community, in the 1976 Queen's Birthday Honours. She died on 4 September 1988, and her ashes were buried at Taupo Public Cemetery.

Notes

References

Women in Parliamentary Life 1970–1990: Hocken Lecture 1993 by Marilyn Waring, page 35 (Hocken Library, University of Otago, 1994) 

1911 births
1988 deaths
New Zealand National Party MPs
Women members of the New Zealand House of Representatives
New Zealand Members of the Order of the British Empire
Burials at Taupo Public Cemetery
Members of the New Zealand House of Representatives
New Zealand MPs for North Island electorates
20th-century New Zealand politicians
20th-century New Zealand women politicians
New Zealand justices of the peace